Lajos Keresztes (30 April 1900 in Alsósófalva (now Ocna de Jos, Romania) – 9 August 1978 in Budapest) was a Hungarian wrestler and Olympic champion in Greco-Roman wrestling.

Olympics
Keresztes competed at the 1924 Summer Olympics in Paris where he won a silver medal in Greco-Roman wrestling, the lightweight class. He won a gold medal at the 1928 Summer Olympics in Amsterdam.

References

External links
 

1900 births
1978 deaths
Olympic wrestlers of Hungary
Wrestlers at the 1924 Summer Olympics
Wrestlers at the 1928 Summer Olympics
Hungarian male sport wrestlers
Olympic gold medalists for Hungary
Olympic silver medalists for Hungary
Olympic medalists in wrestling
Medalists at the 1924 Summer Olympics
Medalists at the 1928 Summer Olympics
20th-century Hungarian people